The following squads and players competed in the women's handball tournament at the 1996 Summer Olympics.

Angola
The following players represented Angola:

 Anica Neto
 Maria Gonçalves
 Filomena Trindade
 Domingas Cordeiro
 Maura Faial
 Aña Bela Joaquim
 Lili Webba-Torres
 Palmira de Almeida
 Luzia María Bizerra
 Justina Praça
 Lia Paulo
 Mária Eduardo
 Elisa Peres

China
The following players represented China:

 Che Zhihong
 Chen Bangping
 Chen Haiyun
 Cong Yanxia
 Li Jianfang
 Shi Wei
 Wang Tao
 Yu Geli
 Zhai Chao
 Zhang Li
 Zhang Limei
 Zhao Ying

Denmark
Head coach: Ulrik Wilbek

The following players represented Denmark:

Germany
The following players represented Germany:

 Andrea Bölk
 Bianca Urbanke
 Tine Lindemann
 Csilla Elekes
 Eike Bram
 Emilia Luca
 Eva Kiss-Györi
 Franziska Heinz
 Grit Jurack
 Heike Murrweiss
 Marlies Waelzer
 Melanie Schliecker
 Michaela Erler
 Michaela Schanze
 Miroslava Ritskiavitchius

Hungary
The following players represented Hungary:

 Éva Erdős
 Andrea Farkas
 Beáta Hoffmann
 Anikó Kántor
 Erzsébet Kocsis
 Beatrix Kökény
 Eszter Mátéfi
 Auguszta Mátyás
 Anikó Meksz
 Anikó Nagy
 Helga Németh
 Ildikó Pádár
 Beáta Siti
 Anna Szántó
 Katalin Szilágyi
 Beatrix Tóth

Norway
The following players represented Norway:

 Heidi Tjugum
 Tonje Larsen
 Kjersti Grini
 Kristine Duvholt
 Susann Goksør-Bjerkrheim
 Kari Solem
 Mona Dahle
 Ann-Cathrin Eriksen
 Hege Kvitsand
 Trine Haltvik
 Kristine Moldestad
 Annette Skotvoll
 Mette Davidsen
 Sahra Hausmann
 Hilde Østbø

South Korea
The following players represented South Korea:

 Cho Eun-Hee
 Han Sun-Hee
 Hong Jeong-ho
 Huh Soon-Young
 Kim Cheong-Sim
 Kim Eun-Mi
 Kim Jeong-Mi
 Kim Mi-Sim
 Kim Rang
 Kwag Hye-Jeong
 Lee Sang-Eun
 Lim O-Kyeong
 Moon Hyang-Ja
 Oh Sung-Ok
 Oh Yong-Ran
 Park Jeong-Lim

United States
The following players represented the United States:

 Dawn Allinger
 Pat Neder
 Sharon Cain
 Kim Clarke
 Laura Coenen
 Kristen Danihy
 Jennifer Demby-Horton
 Lisa Eagen
 Laurie Fellner
 Chryssandra Hires
 Tami Jameson
 Toni Jameson
 Dannette Leininger
 Dawn Marple
 Carol Peterka
 Cheryl Abplanalp

References

1996